Belonuchus rufipennis is a species of large rove beetle in the family Staphylinidae. It is found in North America. It can grow to be between 4.6mm to 9mm.

References

Further reading

 

Staphylininae
Articles created by Qbugbot
Beetles described in 1801